Sidorov (masculine) or Sidorova (feminine) is a common Russian last name derived from the male given name Sidor (from Isidore — gift of Isis) and literally means Sidor's.

The following people share this last name:
Achim Sidorov (born 1936), Romanian sprint canoer 
Alexei Sidorov (1968–2003), Russian journalist 
Anatoly Sidorov (born 1958), Russian military officer
Andrey Sidorov (born 1995), Uzbekistani football midfielder
Maksim Sidorov (disambiguation) – multiple people
Mikhail Sidorov (1823–1887), Siberian entrepreneur
Sidorova Island, an island in the Kara Sea named after Mikhail
Mikhail Sidorov (rugby union) (born 1986), Russian rugby union player
Nikolay Sidorov (born 1956), Soviet sprinter
Nikolai Sidorov (footballer) (born 1974), Russian football coach and former player
Oleg Sidorov (born 1983), Uzbekistan swimmer
Pavel Sidorov (born 1976), Kazakh swimmer
Roman Sidorov (1955–2015), Russian football forward
Vadim Sidorov (born 1959), Russian long-distance runner
Vasily Sidorov (1945-2020), Soviet and Russian diplomat
Vitaliy Sidorov (disambiguation) – multiple people
Yevgeni Sidorov (born 1956), Soviet Russian football midfielder

Sidorova also refers to:
Anastasia Sidorova (born 1996), Russian artistic gymnast
Anna Sidorova (born 1991), Russian curler
Anzhelika Sidorova (born 1991), Russian pole vaulter
Galina Sidorova (born 1945), Soviet alpine skier
Ksenija Sidorova (born 1988), Latvian accordionist
Olga Sidorova (disambiguation) – multiple people
Maria Sidorova, Russian handball player
Marina Sidorova (born 1950), Russian sprinter
Sophia Sidorova (born 1943), public education worker in Ukraine and Crimea 
9005 Sidorova, an asteroid named after Sophia
Tatyana Sidorova (born 1936), Russian speed skater 
Valentina Sidorova (1954–2021), Soviet fencer
Yevgeniya Sidorova (1930–2003), Soviet alpine skier

Russian-language surnames